The Guadalupe Mountains of Hidalgo County are a 13 mi (21 km) long, sub–range in southwest Hidalgo County, New Mexico, adjacent the southeast border of Arizona's Cochise County. A small portion of the range is in Cochise County, namely the outlet of Guadalupe Canyon, famous for the Guadalupe Canyon Massacre. The very southern end of the range is also in the border region of Sonora, just north of Federal Highway 2.

The Guadalupe Mountains are on the southern end of the extensive north–south Peloncillo Mountains, that abut the Arizona border.

Range description
The Guadalupe Mountains are a short sub-range, and about 13 mi long, north to south. The range narrows southwards, with Guadalupe Canyon in the center-west of the south section, with Guadalupe Creek traversing due south. The Canyon then turns due west to have its outlet in Arizona.

The north end of the range contains the highpoint of Guadalupe Mountain in the center west. It is the origin of Guadalupe Creek's headwaters flowing due southeast and south; directly northwest, north, and east of Guadalupe Mountain are the headwaters of Cloverdale Creek.

Highpoints
Guadalupe Spring is on its south, part of the headwaters of Guadalupe Creek-Guadalupe Canyon; to the east, are the headwaters of Cloverdale Creek that flows eastwards towards the ghost town site of Cloverdale.

See also
 Guadalupe Canyon Massacre
 Guadalupe Mountains National Park

References

External links
Guadalupe Mountains
 Hidalgo County history, Guadalupe Mountains
 Guadalupe Mountains, peakbagging.com
Bunk Robinson Peak
 Trails near Bunk Robinson Peak, (coordinates), at trails.com
Guadalupe Mountain
 Guadalupe Mountain Summit, mountainzone.com

Mountain ranges of New Mexico
Mountain ranges of Sonora
New Mexico Bootheel
Mountain ranges of Hidalgo County, New Mexico
Mountain ranges of Cochise County, Arizona
Mountain ranges of Arizona